Bonnie MacBird  is an American writer, actress and producer of screen, stage and prose. She is the original writer of the science fiction film Tron.

MacBird is a native of San Francisco, California and graduated from Stanford University with a bachelor's degree in music and a master's degree in film. She is married to computer scientist Alan Kay.

Film career
MacBird has spent most of her career in Hollywood as a screenwriter and producer. She wrote the original drafts of Tron and received a "story by" credit. She worked in feature film development for Universal Studios in the 1970s, won two Emmy Awards as a producer in the 1980s, and was, for ten years, the head of a firm called Creative License/SkyBird Productions. She has a number of acting and writing credits in Los Angeles theatre.

She continues to write, direct and act in theatre in Los Angeles and is a voice actor for SkyBoat Media.

Novels
Her first Sherlock Holmes novel, Art in The Blood, was published by HarperCollins in 2015. A second Holmes mystery, Unquiet Spirits, followed in 2017.  A third, The Devil's Due, was released in 2019, followed by The Three Locks in 2021. Her fifth novel, What Child is This?: A Sherlock Holmes Christmas Adventure, appeared in 2022 and was illustrated by Frank Cho.

Teaching
She lectures regularly on writing, the creative process, and Sherlock Holmes. She also teaches screenwriting at UCLA extension.

References

External links

UCLA Extension class
Songwriting

Living people
Stanford University alumni
Year of birth missing (living people)
20th-century American actresses
21st-century American actresses
21st-century American novelists
Actresses from California
American mystery writers
American film actresses
American women screenwriters
American screenwriters
American women dramatists and playwrights
Screenwriting instructors
Sherlock Holmes scholars
Women science fiction and fantasy writers
Emmy Award winners